Old Alex Hockey Club is a women's field hockey club based at Alexandra College in Milltown, Dublin, Ireland. The club enters teams in the Women's Irish Hockey League, the Women's Irish Senior Cup and the Women's Irish Junior Cup. The club was founded in 1893 as Alexandra Hockey Club. It claims to be the oldest women's field hockey club in Ireland. In 1947 it was renamed Old Alexandra Hockey Club.

History

Early years
Old Alex was founded in 1893 as Alexandra Hockey Club. It claims to be the oldest women's field hockey club in Ireland. It was originally a field hockey and tennis club for past and present pupils of Alexandra College. The club played their first game on Saint Patrick's Day in 1893 against Merton Hockey Club. Initially the subscription fee was two shillings and six pence and only Alexandra College pupils were allowed to join. In 1894 the club become founder members of the Irish Ladies Hockey Union. Two club members, Miss Story and Miss Lyster, arranged the union's first meeting at Alexandra College. In 1947 the club was renamed Old Alexandra Hockey Club and in 1960 it became an open club, allowing players with no previous connection to the College to join.

Irish Senior Cup
Old Alex won the Women's Irish Senior Cup for the first time in 1906.

Notes

Women's Irish Hockey League
During the 2010s Old Alex regularly played in the Women's Irish Hockey League. After several seasons outside the national league, Old Alex gained promotion in 2018 after defeating Dublin University 2–1 in a promotion/relegation playoff.

Irish Junior Cup
Old Alex's second team enter the Women's Irish Junior Cup.

Home grounds
Old Alex are based at Alexandra College. The club has hosted interprovincial and international games. On 2 March 1896 the club hosted the first ever women's international field hockey match when Ireland defeated England 2–0.

Notable former players

Internationals
 
When the Ireland women's national field hockey team won the silver medal at the 2018 Women's Hockey World Cup, the squad included two former Old Alex players – Emily Beatty and Shirley McCay.

 Emily Beatty
 Jeamie Deacon
 Nicky King 
 Shirley McCay

 
 Jessica Jecko

Umpire
 Carol Metchette

First team coaches

Honours
Women's Irish Senior Cup
Winners: 1906, 1907, 1922, 1924, 1988, 1991: 6 
Runners Up: 1925, 1934, 1986, 1998, 2006 : 5
Women's Irish Junior Cup
Winners: 1915, 1920, 1921, 2007: 4 
Runners Up: 1998, 2005, 2010: 3

References

External links
 Old Alex Hockey Club on Facebook
 Old Alex Hockey Club on Twitter

Women's Irish Hockey League teams
Sports clubs in Dublin (city)
1893 establishments in Ireland
Field hockey clubs established in 1893
Field hockey clubs in County Dublin
Milltown, Dublin